Russellville is a census-designated place in Hamblen County, Tennessee, United States.  Located along U.S. Route 11E-Tennessee State Route 34 (US 11E/SR 34), it is situated approximately at a midpoint between Whitesburg and Morristown.

Demographics

History
Russellville was founded by George Russell in 1784. He had been granted a large tract of land in Greene County, North Carolina.

During the American Civil War, Confederate Lieutenant General James Longstreet established a headquarters in the Nenney House in Russellville just after the Battle of Bean's Station in December 1863. His Confederate army used Russellville for their winter camp of 1863-64. The house still stands and has been converted into The General Longstreet Museum. Also during that winter, General Lafayette McLaws was in quarters at a house now called "Hayslope", a house that also still stands and was originally a tavern built by the early settlers. It was originally called the Tavern with the Red Door, while General Joseph B. Kershaw was at the nearby Taylor plantation. The nearby Bethesda Presbyterian Church was used as a hospital during the Civil War and is listed on the National Register of Historic Places. It has many wartime burials, 80 of which are unidentified.

In the mid and early twentieth century, Russellville was a hub for production and distribution of bootleg whiskey.

As of 2020, portions of the Russellville community, including an industrial park, have been annexed into the city limits of Morristown.

Depending on the reference, Edward R. Talley was born on either September 6 or 8, 1890 in Russellville, Tennessee. He joined the United States Army from Russellville and after completing recruit training was sent to France where he distinguished himself in action near Ponchaux, France. He was a Sergeant, in Company L, 117th Infantry, 30th Division when he was awarded the Medal of Honor for his actions on October 7, 1918.

Talley died December 14, 1950, and is buried at Bent Creek Cemetery in Whitesburg, Tennessee.

References

Further reading
 Emma Dean Smith Trent (1987), East Tennessee's Lore of Yesteryear.
 Rebecca Dougherty Hyatt (1970), "History Around Russellville".

External links
 The History of Hayslope
 Hamblen County TNGenWeb site

Populated places established in 1784
Unincorporated communities in Hamblen County, Tennessee
Census-designated places in Tennessee
U.S. Route 11